The Archives of Sexual Behavior is a peer-reviewed academic journal in sexology. It is the official publication of the International Academy of Sex Research.

History 
The journal was established in 1971 by Richard Green, who served as its editor-in-chief until 2001. He was succeeded by Kenneth J. Zucker. It is published by Springer Science+Business Media and has become a leading journal in its field. Associated with its editorial board and the International Academy of Sex Research are many of the world's leading figures in gender and sexuality research, including Richard Green, Kenneth Zucker, Milton Diamond, J. Michael Bailey, and Carol Martin.

Article categories 
The types of articles published in the journal include:
 empirical research (both quantitative and qualitative)
 theoretical reviews and essays
 clinical case reports
 letters to the editor
 book reviews

Abstracting and indexing 
Archives of Sexual Behavior is abstracted and indexed in Biological Abstracts, Current Contents/Social & Behavioral Sciences, EMBASE, Family & Society Studies Worldwide, Health and Safety Science Abstracts, Index Medicus/MEDLINE, Psychological Abstracts, PsycINFO, Referativny Zhurnal, Risk Abstracts, Sage Family Studies Abstracts, Scopus, Sexual and Relations Therapy, Social Sciences Citation Index, Social Science Index, Sociological Abstracts, Studies on Women & Gender Abstracts, and Violence and Abuse Abstracts. According to the Journal Citation Reports, the journal's 2020 impact factor is 4.507.

References

External links 

 

Sexual orientation and medicine
Sexology journals
Bimonthly journals
Publications established in 1971
Springer Science+Business Media academic journals
English-language journals